Kopa or KOPA may refer to:

Places
Kopa, Estonia, village in Hiiu Parish, Hiiu County, Estonia
Kopa, Iran, village in Gilan Province, Iran
Lake Kopa, lake in Akmola Province, Kazakhstan

People with the surname
Jerzy Kopa (born 1943), Polish football player
Raymond Kopa (1931−2017), French football player
Matt Kopa (born 1987), American football player

Other uses
KOPA-CD, a low-power television station (channel 9, virtual 12) licensed to serve Gillette, Wyoming, United States
KPRI, a radio station (91.3 FM) licensed to serve Pala, California, United States, which held the call sign KOPA from 2009 to 2018
KSLX-FM, a radio station (100.7 FM) licensed to Scottsdale, Arizona, United States, which held the call sign KOPA from 1978 to 1986
BOPA, Danish resistance movement, originally known as KOPA (Kommunistiske Partisaner)
Kopa (number), medieval unit of amount equal to 60
Kadua cordata, a Hawaiian plant
Kopa (The Lion King), character from the series The Lion King